The 2016–17 WNBL season is the 37th season of competition since its establishment in 1981. The regular season began on October 7, 2016 when the Sydney Uni Flames host the Perth Lynx and is scheduled to conclude on February 19, 2017.

Team standings

Regular season

Round 1

Round 2

Round 3

Round 4

Round 5

Round 6

Round 7

Round 8

Round 9

Round 10

Round 11

Round 12

Round 13

Round 14

Round 15

Round 16

Round 17

Round 18

Round 19

Statistics

League leaders

Points

Rebounds

Assists

Blocks

Steals

References

2016–17 WNBL season
Women's National Basketball League lists